UIU may refer to:

United International University, a private university located in Dhaka, Bangladesh
Upper Iowa University, a private university located in Fayette, Iowa